The 2013/14 Oberliga season was the 55th season of the Oberliga, the third-tier of German ice hockey. For the fourth time in history, the Oberliga was split into four regional leagues (North, South, East, West). 39 teams competed in the season that spanned from 4 October 2013 till 21 April 2014. There was no Oberliga champion in 2013/14, due to an expanded DEL2 promotion stage replacing the Oberliga Championship playoffs. Löwen Frankfurt and EC Kassel Huskies secured promotion to DEL2. Schweinfurt Mighty Dogs was the only team relegated to Regionalliga.

Oberliga North

Operated by the German Ice Hockey Federation (DEB), Oberliga North had three new teams for 2013/14 for a total of nine teams. EC Harzer Falken were promoted from Regionalliga North, Hannover Scorpions were demoted from DEL after their licence was sold and Hannover Indians were demoted from 2. Bundesliga due to bankruptcy. The regular Oberliga North season operated a 32 match format with each team playing each other four times. The top four teams qualifying for the DEL2 promotion play-offs and the bottom five teams progressing to the Oberliga Nord Pokal (Oberliga North Cup).

Regular season

Oberliga Nord Pokal

Format: Best of three match series' for qualification and main rounds 
Source: www.pointstreak.com

Oberliga South

Operated by the German Ice Hockey Federation (DEB), Oberliga South covers the states of Baden-Württemberg and Bavaria. Oberliga South had one new team for 2013/14 for a total of twelve teams. EHC Bayreuth was promoted and joined the league as champions of Regionalliga Süd-West. With no team relegated from 2. Bundesliga to Oberliga South, Erding Gladiators were permitted to remain in the league rather than being relegated to the Regionalliga. Oberliga South regular season ran from 20 September 2013 till 23 February 2014 and saw the twelve teams play a 44 match season with each team playing each other four times. The top eight teams qualified for the DEL2 promotion play-offs while the bottom four teams progressed to the Bayernliga relegation play-offs.

Regular season

Relegation play-offs

The bottom four teams from the regular season compete in the Bayernliga relegation play-offs. The play-offs consists of two rounds. The losers from round one progress to round two. The loser of round two is relegated to the Bayernliga. EV Weiden Blue Devils lost the relegation play-offs and were set to be relegated until the Schweinfurt Mighty Dogs withdrew from the league and were relegated in Weiden's place.

Format: Best of five match series' for both rounds 
Source: www.pointstreak.com

Oberliga East

Operated by the Berlin Ice Sports Association (LEV-Berlin), Oberliga East covers the states of Berlin, Brandenburg, Saxony, Saxony-Anhalt and Thuringia. Oberliga East had one team change from the previous season. ECC Preussen Berlin withdrew from the league, leaving Oberliga East with eight teams. The format for the regular season saw each team play each other four times for a total of 28 matches. The top two teams in the standings at the end of the regular season qualify for the DEL2 promotion play-offs and the bottom six teams progress to the Oberliga Ost Pokal (Oberliga East Cup).

Regular season

Oberliga Ost Pokal

The bottom six teams from the regular season progressed to the Ost Pokal. The Ost Pokal involved two stages, a group stage and an elimination stage. The group stage saw the six teams split into two groups of three teams and was contested between 14 February and 2 March 2014. The top two teams of each group progressed to the elimination stage, which involved three match series' for the semi-finals and final. The elimination matches were played between 7 March and 22 March 2014.

Group stage

Group A

Group B

Elimination stage

Format: Best of three match series' for both rounds 
Source: www.pointstreak.com

Oberliga West

Operated by the Ice Sports Association North Rhine-Westphalia (LEV-NRW), Oberliga West covers the states of Hessen, North Rhine-Westphalia, Rhineland-Palatinate and Saarland. For 2013/14, Oberliga West had ten participating teams. Team changes from the previous season included, Rote Teufel Bad Nauheim (promoted to DEL2), Krefeld EV 1981 U23 (withdrawn from league), EHC Neuwied and Herford EV (relegated to Regionalliga West), Herner EV 2007, Grefrather EG and Neusser EV (promoted from Regionalliga West) and EHC Dortmund (withdrawn due to missing cut-off date to register team).

The Oberliga West regular season ran from 27 September till 20 December 2013. The league operated with each team playing each other team twice for a total of 18 matches. The top six in the standings qualified for the DEL2 promotion playoffs as well as the Oberliga West championship round. The bottom four teams progressed to the relegation round and were joined by four Regionalliga West teams.

Regular season

Championship round

Relegation round

DEL2 promotion playoffs

The promotion play-offs for the DEL2 were played over two phases. Phase one consisted of twin play-off tournaments. One tournament for Oberliga North, East and West combined and one tournament for Oberliga South. Each of the two play-off tournaments would see two teams qualify for phase two. Phase two consisted of a 10 match, six team round-robin tournament. Joining the four qualified Oberliga teams was the two lowest ranked DEL2 teams from the 2013/14 DEL2 regular season. The top four teams at the end of the tournament would qualify for promotion to DEL2 with the bottom two qualifying for Oberliga.

Oberliga North, east, west playoffs

The six west qualifiers, four north and two east split up into two groups. The two groups played a ten match round-robin tournament with the winners progressing to qualification phase two.

Group A

Group B

Oberliga South playoffs

The eight teams that progressed from the Oberliga South regular season split into two brackets of four teams each. In a best of seven series knock-out format, the winners of each bracket progressed to phase two qualification.

Format: Best of seven match series' 
Source: www.pointstreak.com

DEL2 qualification playoffs

For 2014/15, DEL2 was expanding the league size by two teams to fourteen total teams. The league needed an additional two Oberliga teams to be promoted. Joining the Kassel Huskies, Löwen Frankfurt, EHC Freiburg and VER Selb for the qualification tournament was DEL2 teams, Eispiraten Crimmitschau and ESV Kaufbeuren. The six teams played a ten match round-robin format. The top four teams would qualify for the 2014/15 DEL2 season. The bottom two teams would qualify for the 2014/15 Oberliga season. The playoffs ran from 23 March till 21 April 2014. The playoffs resulted in Crimmitschau and Kaufbeuren retaining their DEL2 status. Kassel and Frankfurt were promoted. Freiburg and Selb retained their Oberliga status.

References

External links

 Official website
 Elite Prospects home

Oberliga (ice hockey) seasons
2013–14 in German ice hockey